Castelletto Cervo is a comune (municipality) in the Province of Biella in the Italian region Piedmont, located about  northeast of Turin and about  southeast of Biella. 

Castelletto Cervo borders the municipalities of Buronzo, Gifflenga, Lessona, Masserano, and Mottalciata.

Main sights
Castle, dating to c. 13th century
Parish church
Romanesque monastic complex of San Pietro di Castelletto, built in 1087-1092.

References

External links

Cities and towns in Piedmont